Ray Beckett is a British sound engineer. He won an Academy Award in the category Best Sound Mixing for the film The Hurt Locker. He has worked on over 40 films since 1977.

Selected filmography
 The Hurt Locker (2009)
 Coriolanus (2011)
 Zero Dark Thirty (2012)

References

External links

Year of birth missing (living people)
Living people
British audio engineers
Best Sound Mixing Academy Award winners
Best Sound BAFTA Award winners